Başar is a Turkish male given name and surname.

Name statistics
Başar is the 1020th most popular name in Turkey. 1/9,816 of all Turks are named Başar, so its popularity is 0.1 in a thousand. If this is compared to Turkey's population statistics, there are 7,423 Başars and 119 are born each year.

Given name
Başar Sabuncu, Turkish film director, screenwriter, cinematographer and occasional actor
Başar Oktar, Turkish Figure Skater

Surname
Günseli Başar (1932–2013), Turkish beauty contestant and Miss Europe 1952
Kemal Başar, Turkish theatre director, drama teacher and translator
Metehan Başar (born 1991), Turkish wrestler
Şükûfe Nihal Başar (1896–1973), Turkish school teacher, poet, novelist and women's right activist
Tamer Başar, Turkish control theorist

References

Turkish masculine given names
Turkish-language surnames